Fritz Fuchs (born 18 October 1943, in Kaiserslautern) is a German former football coach and player. As a player, he spent six seasons in the Bundesliga with 1. FC Kaiserslautern. As a coach, his biggest success was managing FC 08 Homburg to their promotion to the Bundesliga.

His son Uwe Fuchs is a coach as well. His brother Werner Fuchs was also a football coach.

Honours as a player
 DFB-Pokal finalist: 1971–72

References

External links
 

1943 births
Living people
German footballers
Association football defenders
Bundesliga players
1. FC Kaiserslautern players
BFV Hassia Bingen players
German football managers
BFV Hassia Bingen managers
FSV Salmrohr managers
SC Freiburg managers
Kickers Offenbach managers
SSV Ulm 1846 managers
FC 08 Homburg managers
Arminia Bielefeld managers
1. FC Saarbrücken managers
1. FC Union Berlin managers
Rot-Weiss Essen managers
FK Pirmasens managers
SV Alsenborn players
West German footballers
West German football managers
People from Kaiserslautern
Footballers from Rhineland-Palatinate